The following is a list of ice hockey teams in Manitoba, past and present. It includes the league(s) they play for, and championships won.

Major Professional

National Hockey League

World Hockey Association

Minor Professional

Current teams

American Hockey League

Former teams

International Hockey League

Western Hockey League (minor pro)

Junior

Western Hockey League

Manitoba Junior Hockey League (Junior 'A')

Saskatchewan Junior Hockey League (Junior 'A')

Capital Region Junior Hockey League (Junior 'B')

Keystone Junior Hockey League (Junior 'B')

Hanover Tache Junior Hockey League (Junior 'C')

Manitoba Major Junior Hockey League (Junior 'OA')

Semi-professional, senior and amateur

Senior

Amateur (Stanley Cup Challenge Era)

University

Western Women's Hockey League

League, regional and national championships

†Includes win by the Flin Flon Bombers of the Saskatchewan Junior Hockey League.

See also

Hockey Manitoba

References

Manitoba teams

Ice hockey teams
Ice hockey teams in Manitoba